Kinzhal may refer to:
 Khanjali, double-edged dagger
 Kh-47M2 Kinzhal, Russian hypersonic ballistic missile

See also
 Kinzal, trade name of Telmisartan, a drug